Écardenville-la-Campagne is a commune in the Eure department in northern France.

Population

See also
Communes of the Eure department

References

Communes of Eure